Ivan Dodig was the defending champion but chose not to defend his title.

Luca Vanni won the title after defeating Matteo Berrettini 5–7, 6–0, 6–3 in the final.

Seeds

Draw

Finals

Top half

Bottom half

References
Main Draw
Qualifying Draw

Internazionali di Tennis Castel del Monte - Singles
2016 Singles
2016 in Italian tennis